Douglas Tirola, also known as Doug Tirola, is an American filmmaker and writer who has worked as a director, executive producer and a producer. He is the owner and president of 4th Row Films, a movie and television production company. Tirola's work includes A Reason to Believe (1995), Hey Bartender (2013) and National Lampoon: Drunk Stoned Brilliant Dead (2015).

Awards
Hey Bartender was nominated in the Special/Documentary category at the 2015 James Beard Foundation Broadcast Media Awards. Actress was nominated for Best Documentary at the 2014 Gotham Independent Film Awards.

Filmography
Projects Tirola has worked on include:
 Undercover Blues (1993)
 A Reason to Believe (1995) 
 The Lucky Ones (2004)
 All In: The Poker Movie (2009)
 Making the Boys (2009)
 Folks! (2010)
 Fake It So Real (2011)
 Hey Bartender (2013)
 Actress (2014)
 Taking the Heat (TV Movie) (2015)
 The X Effect (TV series) (2015)
 National Lampoon: Drunk Stoned Brilliant Dead (2015)
 Bloodroot (2019)
 Bernstein's Wall (2021)

References

External links
 

American film directors
1968 births
Living people